Serge Patrick Ngoma (born July 9, 2005) is an American soccer player who plays as a winger for Major League Soccer club New York Red Bulls.

Career

Youth
Born in North Plainfield, New Jersey, Ngoma joined New York Red Bulls Academy in 2017. Ngoma made his professional debut for New York Red Bulls II, the reserve team of the New York Red Bulls, on September 23, 2020, against Atlanta United 2. He came on as a 69th-minute substitute for Omar Sowe as Red Bulls II were defeated 5–3. On August 20, 2021, he scored his first professional goal in a 3–2 defeat against the Charleston Battery.

New York Red Bulls
On February 17, 2022, the New York Red Bulls signed Ngoma to a four-year homegrown contract deal to play with the first team with an option year in 2026. On February 26, 2022, Ngoma made his debut for the first team, coming on as a second half substitute in a 3-1 victory over San Jose Earthquakes in the opening match of the season. On June 30, 2022, Ngoma scored his first goal for the Red Bulls against Atlanta United in a 2–1 win. On July 24, 2022, Ngoma made his first start for New York in a 4-3 victory over Austin FC, scoring the opening goal of the match at Q2 Stadium.

Personal life
Born in the United States, Ngoma is of Gabonese descent.

Career statistics

References

External links
Profile at the US Soccer Development Academy website

2005 births
Living people
American soccer players
American people of Gabonese descent
Soccer players from New Jersey
Association football forwards
USL Championship players
New York Red Bulls II players
New York Red Bulls players
Homegrown Players (MLS)
Major League Soccer players